Pulau Seletar (or Seletar Island) is an island situated in the Straits of Johor off the northern coast of Singapore. Located within Singapore waters, it has an area of 38.5 hectare. It lies within a bay into which several streams flow, including the waters of mainland Singapore's only hot spring.

Pulau Seletar forms a single subzone of its own, located within the planning area of Simpang.

Pulau Seletar is home to mangrove trees, the tallest of which reach a height of 80 feet.

References

Islands of Singapore